The 1856 East Suffolk by-election was held on 26 December 1856 after the death of the incumbent Conservative MP Sir Edward Gooch.  It was won by the unopposed Conservative MP, John Henniker-Major.

References

East
1856 elections in the United Kingdom
1856 in England
East
December 1856 events